Ticaboo is an unincorporated community in far southeastern Garfield County, Utah, United States.

Description
It has a post office with the ZIP code 84533. Ticaboo gets its name from Ticaboo Creek, which was named by Cass Hite in the 1880s, from a Paiute word meaning "friendly".

History

The Ticaboo townsite is a master-planned community that was organized in the late 1970s to both provide housing to the then booming uranium mining industry in southeastern Garfield County, and tap into the tourism potential of nearby Lake Powell. The Ticaboo Resort was developed to provide accommodations to guests visiting the remote area as well as to encourage the development of a tourism base outside of Bullfrog in the northern Lake Powell area.

The first inhabitants of Ticaboo were Kayenta Anasazi. In October 1981, the Division of Utah State History conducted an excavation of a small settlement known as the Ticaboo Town Ruins, located directly west of the town of Ticaboo.

Ticaboo Resort is one of many master development lease holders tasked with the development of Ticaboo by the Utah School and Trust Lands Administration (SITLA). Previous master development lease holders have included mining companies who also owned mines in the Henry Mountain Complex, or the Shootaring Mill. Established in 1977, Plateau Resources Limited was the master development lease holder and constructed the infrastructure that still exists today for electric, water, and wastewater.

Trail of the Ancients
Ticaboo is on Utah State Route 276, which is a part of the Trail of the Ancients National Scenic Byway.

See also

References

External links

 Ticaboo at Garfield County Office of Tourism

Unincorporated communities in Garfield County, Utah
Unincorporated communities in Utah
1977 establishments in Utah
Populated places established in 1977